Schuller's view is a lateral radiographic view of skull principally used for viewing mastoid cells. The central beam of X-rays passes from one side of the head and is at angle of 25° caudad to radiographic plate. This angulation prevents overlap of images of two mastoid bones. Radiograph for each mastoid is taken separately. The Schullers view serves as an alternative view to the Law projection which uses a 15 degree angle of patient's face toward the image receptor and a 15 degree caudal angulation of the CR to achieve the same result, a lateral mastoid air cells view without overlap of the opposite side. Ear(pinna) under examination can be taped forward to avoid cartilage shadow around mastoid. Older editions of Merrill's positioning books will have detailed explanation of these and other mastoid positions. Newer texts often omit this because of the rarity of this exam in lieu of computed tomography studies.


Structures seen
 Mastoid air cells
 External auditory canal
 Tympanic cavity
 Temporomandibular joint
 Dural plate
 Sinus plate
 Dense bone of labyrinth

Observations

References

Radiology
Radiography
Ear surgery